The International School of Choueifat, Sharjah is a branch of the International School of Choueifat located in Sharjah, United Arab Emirates that follows the 'SABIS' system. The school opened in 1975 and is located beside Sharjah Cricket Stadium. It was the first Choueifat School in the Middle East outside of Lebanon.

Campus 
The Sharjah campus includes two indoor swimming pools, a football field, a basketball court, volleyball court, badminton court, a running track, a music room, and a ballet room.

Academics 
The school provides the SABIS curriculum. The system also includes a student-led organisation. They take care of extra curricular activities and study session with the help of staff members and faculty. Examples of extracurricular activities include: swimming, tennis, table tennis, volleyball, football, painting, and music.

The Student Life Organization (SLO) involves student volunteers earning points, which they may add to their resume and experience. They organize in-school teams, academic and athletic competitions, field trips, as well as school sponsored events.

Education in the United Arab Emirates